Tammy Mercure (born 1976) is an American photographer based in Violet, Louisiana.

In 2012, Mercure was named one of Oxford American magazine's 100 New Superstars of Southern Art.

Early life and education 
Mercure received a Bachelor of Fine Arts from Columbia College Chicago in 1999 and a Master of Fine Arts from East Tennessee State University in 2009.

Photography 
Mercure is best known for her photographs of the Southeastern United States. Her work has been featured on VICE, CNN Photos, and Place, Art, and Self (2004) by geographer Yi-Fu Tuan.

Cavaliers 
The series Cavaliers (2008-2014) consists of photographs of people and events throughout Tennessee, Virginia, North Carolina, South Carolina, Kentucky, and Georgia.

Selected bibliography 
 Place, Art, and Self. 2004. University of Virginia Press, Santa Fe, NM, in association with Columbia College, Chicago, IL. .

References

American women photographers
1976 births
Living people
21st-century American women